Kim Ji-heun (also Kim Ji-hyeon, ; born September 10, 1989) is a South Korean swimmer, who specialized in backstroke events. He represented his nation South Korea at the 2008 Summer Olympics, and also claimed a silver medal as a member of the 4×100 m medley relay team at the 2010 Asian Games in Guangzhou, China.

Kim competed for the South Korean swimming team in the men's 200 m backstroke at the 2008 Summer Olympics in Beijing. Leading up to the Games, he topped the field with a solid 2:02.13 to register under the FINA B-cut (2:03.90) at the Jeju Halla National Cup in Jeju City. Pulling from the near bottom of the pack at the 150-metre turn in heat three, Kim put up a late resistant surge on the final stretch to hit the wall with a fifth-place time and his new personal best in 2:00.72. Kim failed to advance to the semifinals, as he placed twenty-sixth out of 42 swimmers in the preliminary heats.

On May 13, 2014, Kim received a two-year suspension from the Korean Swimming Federation and Korea Anti-Doping Disciplinary Panel, after he was tested positive for the clenbuterol.

References

External links
NBC Olympics Profile

1989 births
Living people
South Korean male backstroke swimmers
Olympic swimmers of South Korea
Swimmers at the 2008 Summer Olympics
Swimmers at the 2010 Asian Games
Asian Games medalists in swimming
Swimmers from Seoul
Asian Games silver medalists for South Korea
Medalists at the 2010 Asian Games
21st-century South Korean people